Muse Dash is a rhythm game developed by PeroPeroGames from China, and published by XD Network in Japan and hasuhasu outside of Japan. It was initially released for iOS and Android in June 2018, later being released on Nintendo Switch, Windows and macOS on June 20, 2019. It combines aspects of action games and music games, using an anime art style in the form of a 2D side-scrolling video game. The game also has a DLC expansion pack called "Just as planned" that includes access to hundreds of additional songs and levels.

Gameplay 

In Muse Dash, players defeat enemies and avoid obstacles originating from the right side of the screen by pressing buttons or tapping the screen in accordance with the beat of the song playing in the background. The game has only two buttons, making it easily accessible. Difficulty settings exist for most songs, allowing the game to cater to multiple skill levels.    

The playable characters in Muse Dash are called Muses. Each Muse has her own maximum health and passive skill, depending on the selected costume. Players can also equip Elfins, companions to a Muse which give them additional abilities.

Reception 

The game received "mixed or average reviews" according to review aggregator Metacritic, listing the game with a score of 73/100. Nintendo World Report rated Muse Dash with an 8.5/10, saying that it has a "fun and colorful presentation". CGMagazine reviewed and rated Muse Dash 8/10 in 2019, commenting, "Muse Dash offers enough quality content to keep rhythm game fans busy for a long time."

Mike Fahey of Kotaku praised the game saying that "Rhythm games don't get much simpler and sweeter than Muse Dash", that it controls with just two buttons, the music selection is wonderful, and the characters are charming.

References

External links 

2018 video games
Android (operating system) games
Music video games
Nintendo Switch games
IOS games
Rhythm games
Side-scrolling video games
Video games developed in China
Windows games